Henri Duparc may refer to:

Henri Duparc (composer), French music composer
Henri Duparc (director), Ivorian film director